Zegna is an Italian luxury fashion house. It was founded in 1910 by Ermenegildo Zegna in Trivero, Biella of the Piedmont region of Northern Italy.

As of 2021, the Group is a public company. It is listed on the New York Stock Exchange.

History

Foundation and early years 
Prior to the founding of the company, founder Ermenegildo Zegna's father Angelo – a former watchmaker – owned a wool mill and looms in the Alps of Piedmont, Italy. Ermenegildo, together with his brothers Edoardo and Mario, founded the company in 1910 in Trivero in the Biellese Alps when he was only 18, utilizing his father's looms and assets. In 1915 the company was renamed Fratelli Zegna di Angelo.

Growth 
Zegna's vision was to create high-quality fabrics, so he began to source wool directly from several countries around the world, such as Mongolia, Australia, South Africa; he also bought modern machinery from England.

During the Interwar period, Zegna's business started to flourish. In the late 1920s, the Lanificio (wool mill) employed more than 700 workers, growing to more than 1,000 in the late 1930s. In 1938 the company began to export fabrics in the US, through its subsidiary Zegna Woollens Corporation established in New York City.

In 1942, Ermenegildo's sons Aldo (born in 1920) and Angelo (born in 1924) entered the company, which was renamed Ermenegildo Zegna and Sons. In the mid-1950s, the company employed 1,400 workers.

Second generation 
Ermenegildo Zegna's sons, Aldo and Angelo, took over the company in the mid-1960s. Under their guidance, the label both expanded its business to ready-made suits and established new plants and distribution network abroad. In 1968, the first factory producing sleeve-units and trousers was opened in Novara, followed by openings in Spain, Greece, and Switzerland. Sales and marketing departments were also established in France, Germany, the U.K., and the U.S.

In 1972, Zegna launched its made-to-measure service called Su Misura.

Zegna's attention to wool quality continued through 1960s and 1970s, as the company established the Wool Awards in Australia (1963) and the Mohair Trophy in South Africa (1970).

The international development strategy run by the Zegna brothers brought to the openings of the first owned boutique in Paris in 1980, followed by Milan in 1985. In 1991 Zegna became the first luxury label to open a store in China.

Third generation

1990s to present 
During the 1990s, the third generation of the Zegna family entered the business. Angelo's son, and namesake of the company's founder, Ermenegildo "Gildo" Zegna, became CEO of the Group in 1997; his cousin Paolo became the chairman. Under their governance, the company began a strategy of brand extension and full verticalization.

In 1991 Zegna was the first luxury brand to enter the China market, with a flagship store in Beijing; and one of the first to access the Indian market.

In 2008, the Group established its new headquarters in Milan, in a building designed by architects Antonio Citterio and Gianmaria Beretta.

Acquisitions 
Moreover, a large number of acquisitions and partnerships have been signed since the late 1990s to the present day.

In 2014, Zegna acquired the majority of Achill, an Australian wool farm counting about 12,500 sheep in its flock.

In 2016, the Group acquired a majority stake in Bonotto, a high-end textile manufacturer based in Molvena, Vicenza, Italy, giving the Group the possibility to explore new areas such as furnishing and experimental fabrics.

Two years later, Zegna – through its subsidiary ZECA company – took over the historic Cappellificio Cervo hat-maker.

In 2018, Ermenegildo Zegna Group – already present in India with three stores – together with Reliance, acquired a stake into Indian fashion designer Raghavendra Rathore's firm. In the same year Zegna announced that they purchased 85% of the eponymously named Thom Browne, a New York City-based menswear and womenswear brand, founded in 2001.

In 2019, Zegna bought a 65% stake of Italian high-quality jersey fabrics manufacturer Dondi, increasing its control over the textile supply chain.

In June 2021, the Zegna Group bought a 60% majority stake in Tessitura Ubertino, a high-end fabric maker based in Piedmont, Italy. A few weeks later, Zegna also bought a 40% share in Tessitura Biagioli Modesto, an Italian spinning mill specialized in cashmere production.

Stock exchange listing 
In 2021, Zegna agreed to go public by combining with a US special-purpose acquisition company launched by European private equity group Investindustrial.

On December 20, 2021, the Zegna Group went public in New York with a valuation of $3.1 billion. It is the first Italian fashion company to be listed in New York.

Brands

Zegna 
Zegna was founded in 1910 as a textile company (“Lanificio Zegna”). The brand is now recognized as a leader in luxury menswear. Formerly known as Ermenegildo Zegna, in 2021, in parallel with the Group's stock market listing, the brand name became simply Zegna. A new logo was also adopted, which recalls a road. This is a tribute to the vision and commitment of the founder, who in the 1930s promoted the construction of a road in Piedmont, which today runs through the Oasi Zegna.

In 2003 Zegna entered the fragrance market. Over the years, it has also signed partnerships with other major brands such as Estee Lauder, Maserati, Marcolin.

Since June 2016, the artistic director of Zegna has been Alessandro Sartori, who is entrusted with the creative functions of all Zegna brands and lines. Sartori promotes values such as corporate responsibility, environmental sustainability, the use of new techniques and materials, as well as a modern and innovative vision of the male wardrobe and masculinity itself.

In 2021, Zegna branded products accounted for 66% of Group revenues.

Thom Browne 
Thom Browne is a New York City-based luxury fashion brand, founded by American designer Thom Browne. Ermenegildo Zegna Group acquired an 85% stake in Thom Browne in August 2018, at a $500 million valuation.

The brand is offered in some 300 stores in 40 countries; in 2021, it accounted for 20% of Group revenues.

Lanificio Zegna 
Lanificio Zegna (“Zegna Wool Mill”) is located in Trivero, in the Piedmont region of Northern Italy. It was founded by Ermenegildo Zegna in 1910, when he was 18. Under the Zegna Group supervision, shorn fleeces coming from several countries are processed at the Lanificio, from raw material to finishing, combining both modern technology and artisan craftsmanship.

Tessitura di Novara 
Tessitura di Novara is a silk-weaving company acquired by Zegna in 2009.

Pettinatura di Verrone 
Founded in 1960, Pettinatura di Verrone is a combing mill based in the textile district of Biella. In 2009, Zegna acquired a 15% stake of the company.

Bonotto 
Originally founded in 1912 as a straw hats maker, Bonotto was converted in a textile manufacturer by Nicla Donazzan and Luigi Bonotto in 1972. In 2016, Zegna Group acquired a controlling stake in the company. Bonotto is known for following a “slow factory” model, aiming at craftsmanship and rejecting standardization and low cost chain production.

Dondi 
Based in the Carpi textile hub, near Modena, Dondi was founded in the 1970s as Dondi Jersey and is a renowned manufacturer of high-end knitwear for men and women. In July 2019, the Zegna group acquired a 65% stake in Dondi, while the remaining 35% is retained by the Dondi Capelli family who still runs the business.

Tessitura Ubertino 
Tessitura Ubertino is a fabric maker specialized in high-end fabrics for womenswear, such as tweed and jacquard. It was founded in 1981 and is based near Biella. In June 2021, the Ermenegildo Zegna Group acquired a 60% stake in the company; the two sons of founder Adalgiso Ubertino have retained a 40% stake.

Filati Biagioli Modesto 
In 2021 Zegna Group and Prada Group jointly acquired the majority shareholding in Filati Biagioli Modesto, a company specialized in cashmere and other noble yarns. Zegna CEO Gildo Zegna was appointed chairman.

Cappellificio Cervo 
Based in Biella, Cappellificio Cervo is a historic hattery acquired by Zegna-controlled ZECA company in 2018.

Tom Ford 
Beginning in late 2022, Zegna designs and produces mens and womens collections under the Tom Ford name following the brand's sale to Estee Lauder. As part of the sale, Tom Ford is signed to stay as creative director for at least a year.

Financial data 
Ermenegildo Zegna Group is the largest menswear brand in the world by revenue. As of 2021, Ermenegildo Zegna operated over 500 retail stores across the world. Following the company's strongly export-oriented strategy, exports account for over 90% of total sales.

Corporate governance 
In 2021, the Group has become a public company. Consequently, Ermenegildo (Gildo) Zegna, grandson of founder Ermenegildo, took on the role of chairman in addition to CEO, while his cousin Paolo Zegna joined the board of directors.

Celebrities 
A number of actors and models have advertised Zegna's lines through the years. Celebrities featured in Zegna's advertising campaigns include Oscar-winning actor Adrien Brody, American model Ryan Burns, Irish actor Jamie Dornan, English actor Sam Riley.

In 2017, Ermenegildo Zegna launched a four-chapter campaign called Defining Moments. The campaign featured Robert De Niro, McCaul Lombardi, Benjamin Millepied, Park Chan-wook, Yoo Ji-tae, Wang Deshun, Sunny Wang, Javier Bardem, Dev Patel. The first three chapters were directed by Craig McDean; the last one was directed by Luca Guadagnino.

In 2019 Zegna launched the new "What does it mean to be a man today?", campaign, featuring Mahershala Ali and Nicholas Tse, focused on the definition of modern masculinity.

Zegna also produced a four-part series of short films titled A Rose Reborn, directed by Park Chan-wook in 2014.

Sustainability commitment
During the 1930s, founder Ermenegildo Zegna actively promoted social facilities in his native town Trivero. Before the advent of popular ecology, he also planted thousands of trees and financed the panoramic road which was named after him. Coherently with the founder's commitment towards sustainability, in 1993 Ermenegildo Zegna Group created the Oasi Zegna, a protected natural area of 100 km2 in the mountains surrounding Trivero. In 2014 the Oasi was granted the patronage of FAI Fondo Ambiente Italiano, the National Trust of Italy.

In 2000 a charity organization, Fondazione Zegna, was set up by the Zegna family with the aim of giving continuity to the founder's thought that quality and dedication can live in harmony with the protection of the natural environment, social welfare and cultural development.

Among the educational projects supported by Fondazione Zegna there is the Ermenegildo Zegna Founder's Scholarship, a program aimed to give continuity to the Zegna family's sense of responsibility through a commitment to donating 25 euro million over 25 years. The program provides €1million annually to enable talented Italian graduates to pursue international postgraduate studies, while encouraging them to return to Italy upon completion of their programs abroad.

In 2019, the Zegna Group launched #UseTheExisting, a project that gives new life to used fabrics and creates new ones from surplus fibers and offcuts, in order to completely reduce waste. The project was awarded the Italian ADI Design Index 2020 Innovation Award.

The Zegna Group is one of the signatories of the Fashion Pact, a plan signed by 32 major fashion brands to reduce their environmental impact. The Pact was presented at the 45th G7 summit in Biarritz on August 26, 2019.

References

External links 

 
 "A Zegna Meditation", Sarah Raper Larenaudie, Time, 29 September 2008

Clothing brands of Italy
Italian companies established in 1910
Clothing companies established in 1910
Fashion accessory brands
High fashion brands
Luxury brands
Manufacturing companies based in Milan
Menswear designers
Privately held companies of Italy
Italian suit makers
Textile companies of Italy
Trivero